Beatrice Alice Brigden (1888-1977) was a Canadian social reformer, feminist and politician. She was a radical for her time, advocating for birth control, the intellectual parity of men and women, and economic security among many other issues. She began her career as a social reformer under the guidance of the Methodist church's Social Gospel but moved more radically to the left when it became apparent from her work with immigrants and laborers that the church was not supportive of social and economic reforms. She was one of the early members of the Brandon Labor Church and was a founder of both the People's Forum Speaker's Bureau and the Labor Women's Social and Economic Conference, the latter of which was merged into the Co-operative Commonwealth Federation (Manitoba Section). Though she was one of the founders of the Co-operative Commonwealth Federation she was unsuccessful in several attempts to win a seat in the Manitoba legislature. In addition to her many programs for women, Brigden also was one of the founders of the Indian-Métis Friendship Centres.

Her biographer, Allison Campbell wrote of her: "By the standards of her time, to be ambitious, deliberately single, determinedly self-supporting and continuously outspoken was cause enough to be labeled as a radical." Social reform was not a side-line to her wifely duties, it was her career.

Biography
Beatrice Alice Brigden was born 30 January 1888 in Hastings, Ontario, Canada to William Brigden and Sarah Jane Wood. When she was one year old her family moved to a farm about 20 miles north of Deloraine, Manitoba. In 1908, Brigden began her schooling at Albert College in Belleville, Ontario, studying arts and vocal expression. After one year, she transferred to Brandon College, and in 1910 received a diploma from the Department of Expression and Physical Culture for proficiency in public speaking. A year later she began studying at The Royal Conservatory of Music in Toronto. In Toronto, part of the student's training was to visit local factories and hospitals, likely with an eye to providing the workers and patients with "uplifting entertainment." Instead, it ignited Brigden's awareness of injustice and gave birth to her social conscience. She saw first-hand the unsanitary conditions, slave-like working conditions, and drudgery of the working classes. She graduated with a degree in psychology and vocal expression from the Conservatory in 1912. During the year that she studied in Brandon, her family relocated there and she remained in that community, until the 1930s.

Brigden's mother was a Quaker and her influence was strongly seen in the development of her ideas on political participation, pacifism and sexual equality, but her father's Methodism had the most immediate impact economically. She joined several organizations, including the Women's Missionary Society, the Epworth League, the church choir, and the temperance organization, the Royal Templars, assuming positions of leadership to gain skills and learn about administration and command. These organizations were steeped in the teachings of social gospel, providing a religious rationale for addressing social concerns and building a moral foundation, which could then address improvements in economic and social situations. In this atmosphere, Brigden began negotiating with the Methodist Church to teach social purity in 1913.

In 1914, they agreed to terms and Brigden began training in La Crosse, Wisconsin as a Methodist social service worker, under a self-directed study of laws governing sexual behavior and books on the psychology of sex. Her studies led her to a different focus than her Methodist employers. They wanted to redeem souls, and while she saw that as important, Brigden acknowledged that addressing economic shortfalls was imperative for real change, foreshadowing her later move into politics. One of the influences for her divergence at this early stage was Jane Addams, who Brigden visited at Hull House, over her employer's objections. There were few, if any, women's predecessors in the Methodist social worker pool and Brigden was responsible for arranging her own itinerary, as well as writing her own lectures and creating the promotional materials she needed. Some of her lectures were presented as social service pamphlets by the church. Her focus for the lectures was on women, as she was prohibited from addressing men, and as was dictated by the times, the lectures did not address men's responsibility for their behaviors but rather trained women to be the "guardians of virtue". Her topics were considered shocking at the time: alcoholism, sexually transmitted diseases, unwed mothers, women's equal right to participate in work, the right to birth control and choice to determine family size.

She spent six years lecturing on sex education and social ills throughout Canada. Increasingly, Brigden found herself turning away from the church and more toward socialism.  After WWI ended, she questioned the purpose of war and attributed a lack of commitment to peace and disarmament in part to the church's failure to support peace and speak out about the harm of war. She was seen as a radical by conservative church members who did not believe that the church's mission extended beyond spiritual spheres.  These concerns were compounded by the lack of the Methodist Church to provide any meaningful response to help the strikers of Winnipeg General Strike of 1919 and their supporters from Brandon, Manitoba and her continuing concern about the limited opportunity she had as a woman for financial security. She resigned after six years and joined the Brandon Labor Church where she served from 1920 to 1928.

The Brandon Labor Church was born out of the 1919 strike, but the strike was not the cause of the church forming. Rather, it was the impetuous for completing a formal organization which had been informally functioning for several years. The Labor Church movement began in Europe in the previous century and provided the link between Brigden's belief in social gospel and her need for political action. Though the Labor Church limited the roles she could play and the positions she could attain, as did the Methodist church, the social philosophy of the Labor Church was more in line with her own desire to help the working classes and immigrants. She ran study groups and children's programs for the church and worked with its socialist ministry  until the church ceased to exist in 1928.

In 1921 Brigden was teaching classes for developmentally challenged children for the local school board, as well as caring for her aging parents and turned down an offer to run on the Dominion Labour Party ticket, but she did agree to become a campaign worker for Robert Forke on the Progressive ticket, which he handily won. In the early 1920s she organized the People's Forum Speaker's Bureau, which included such speakers as John Queen, Anna Louise Strong, Frank Underhill, J. S. Woodsworth and others. The forum was not affiliated specifically with any party, but their sympathies clearly leaned toward labor. The organization sponsored many conferences dealing with labor and women's social and economic situations.

She established the Labor Women's Social and Economic Conference (LWSEC) annual study groups in 1922 in an attempt to address the imbalance in men's and women's political education and women's self-confidence. The organization spread throughout western Canada, having chapters in each major population center. The LWSEC studied a wide variety of issues from access to birth control to wages to legal concerns; health care, dental care, government sponsored hospitals and unemployment insurance to agricultural debt, lack of irrigation, and cooperative markets; and free textbooks to the intellectual equality of men and women. By the middle of the 1930s the group merged with the Cooperative Commonwealth Federation.

When the Labor Church closed in 1928, Brigden began working for the Unemployment Insurance Commission and as a social worker for the United Church. In 1930, she ran as Brandon's first federal Labour Party candidate on a Farmer-Labour platform. but lost to Conservative Candidate David Wilson Beaubier. She was one of only ten female candidates that year, only one of whom won her bid for a federal seat. After loss of 1930 election, she moved to Winnipeg and began submitting articles to labour papers including ILP Weekly News and the Manitoba Commonwealth.

In 1933, she was one of only 21 women who attended the Cooperative Commonwealth Federation Conference in Regina, to formally found the party and launch the Regina Manifesto. In 1936, Brigden ran as ILP-CCF Candidate in the general election. In her interview at the time, she stated that she was working for the Manitoba Human Rights Commission and had been employed by the organization since its founding. She did not win the election, but continued to run in both national and regional elections.

In 1947, Brigden attended the Primer Congreso Interamericano de Mujeres held in Guatemala City, Guatemala as the delegate for the Winnipeg Local Council of Women. The conference was called by the called together by the Women's International League for Peace and Freedom to discuss women's issues, pacifism and promote inter-American policies for dealing with armament, human rights, economic security, and many other topics. Between 1954 and 1958, though not an aboriginal nor were any of the board members, Brigden served on the Indian and Métis Committee. She was recognized as an advocate for women's rights and for aboriginal people and pressed for the opening of the Indian-Métis Friendship Centres to address the needs of urban aboriginal people. In 1958, after four years of planning, a resolution was passed to open a referral centre to help native persons relocating to urban areas access the social services available. The first center opened in 1959. She continued to be active on the Board and in attendance at Conferences for the Indian and Métis Committee until 1969.

Brigden served in multiple capacities for many different women's groups. She had been a President Winnipeg Council of Women, an   organizer of Provincial Council of Women, a member and delegate to international meetings for the University Women's Club, Chairman of the Arts and Letters Committee of the National Council of Women, a member of the Women's International League for Peace and Freedom, an organizer of the SHARE and Open-Door Club for Canadian Mental Health Association, founder of the Indian-Métis Friendship Centres, organizer of Women's Model Parliaments.

CFF became the New Democratic Party in 1961 and she remained active until 1975. In 1970, Brigden was honored by the Manitoba Historical Society receiving a Centennial Medal and in 1973, her alma mater, Brandon University awarded her an honorary degree. She also received the Manitoba Golden Boy Award in recognition of her civic efforts. Brandon University awarded her an honorary degree in 1973. She wrote an autobiography entitled One Woman's Campaign for Social Purity and Social Reform.

Brigden died 22 February 1977 in Winnipeg, Manitoba, Canada and was buried in the Napinka Cemetery.

External links
Mock Parliament, narrated by Beatrice Brigden, 1974

References

1888 births
1977 deaths
Canadian feminists
Canadian socialists
Canadian social workers
Manitoba Co-operative Commonwealth Federation politicians
Canadian socialist feminists
20th-century Canadian politicians